María de la Luz Casas Pérez was a Mexican professor and researcher with the Monterrey Institute of Technology and Higher Studies (Tec de Monterrey), in the field of communications and politics.  Her research work has been recognized by the Mexican government with Level II membership in the Sistema Nacional de Investigadores.

Casas Pérez  earned a bachelor's degree in communications from the Universidad Iberoamericana, a master's degree from the same from McGill University and a doctorate in political science from the Universidad Nacional Autónoma de México where she was awarded the Gabino Barreda medal.

Currently she works with the Tec de Monterrey Cuernavaca campus, teaching with the Humanities, Art and Design Department and researching at the Centro de Investigación en Comunicación e Información, part of the Cátedra de Investigación en Medios de Comunicación. Her teaching and research interests include new technologies, communication, politics and media.

Outside of the Tec de Monterrey, she has professional experience in periodicals, book editing, film, video and has appeared on radio and television programs.

Publications
She has primarily written about communications and politics publishing books, book chapters, journal articles and more.

Books
 Medios de comunicación y libre comercio en México (2000)
 Políticas públicas de comunicación en América del Norte (2006)
 El desarrollo de competencias : el requerimiento ineludible en el siglo XXI, with José Luis Espíndola Castro (2011)

Recent book chapters
 Medios de comunicación, nuevas tecnologías y el futuro de la política in Comunicación, Política y Ciudadanía in Aportaciones actuales al estudio de la comunicación política (2011)
 Medios de comunicación y procesos de intermediación política in Comunicación Política in México: Retos y desafíos ante el proceso democratizador global (2011)
 Twitter, ¿herramienta para la expresión privada, la participación  pública o la construcción de acuerdos? in La participación en redes sociales desde la teoría de la acción social in Twitter como herramienta de participación política y ciudadana (2010)
 Políticas públicas  de comunicación. Un análisis y una propuesta para México in Agenda académica para una comunicación abierta (2010)
 Implicaciones políticas y sociales de la Ley Federal de Telecomunicaciones y de la Ley Federal de Radio y Televisión, para la operación de los medios dentro del marco de la región de América del Norte in La Ley Televisa y la lucha por el poder en México (2009)
 Medios de comunicación ante conflictos sociales y crisis. Los estudios de prospectiva para el análisis de los escenarios de la comunicación política in Comunicación, Medios y Crisis Económica Libro Colectivo (2009)
 Televisión para el Diálogo y la Integración Nacional in Ética e identidad cultural (2009)
 El proceso de discusión de la Ley Federal de Radio, Televisión y Telecomunicaciones en el contexto de la Teoría de la Acción Social in XV Anuario de investigación CONEICC (2008)
 Análisis e investigación de la comunicación social en México in Visiones de América. Comunicación, Mujeres e Interculturalidad (2008)
 Globalización e identidad nacional mexicana: un análisis desde la comunicación in XIV Anuario de la investigación CONEICC (2007)
 Una mirada a las pantallas.  Oferta cinematográfica en México antes y después del TLC in Anuario de Investigación CONEICC XIII (2006)
 Políticas públicas de comunicación, diversidad cultural y sociedad de la información in Memorias del XVIII Encuentro AMIC (2006)

References

See also
 List of Monterrey Institute of Technology and Higher Education faculty

Academic staff of the Monterrey Institute of Technology and Higher Education

Living people
Year of birth missing (living people)